Zuzana Jandová (born 18 August 1987 in Karviná, Czechoslovakia) is a Czech businesswoman, model, charity worker and beauty pageant titleholder who won Miss Czech Republic and represented her country in Miss World 2008 in South Africa. She completed her studies at a business school and she works in Charity Endowment, Help and Support.

References

Living people
Miss World 2008 delegates
1987 births
People from Karviná
Czech beauty pageant winners
Czech female models